Boiling Point is an American six-part television documentary series which premiered on February 21, 2021 on BET.

Episodes

References

External links

2020s American documentary television series
2020s American television miniseries
2021 American television series debuts
BET original programming
English-language television shows
Historical television series
CBS News